Seydou Legacy Athlétique Club, commonly known as SLAC, is a Guinean basketball team from Conakry. The team plays in the Ligue 1, as well as in the Basketball Africa League (BAL) as of the 2022 season. SLAC has won the Ligue 1 championship six times in history.

SLAC plays its home games in the Palais de Sports de Stade du 28 Septembre, located next to the multi-purpose stadium.

History
In March 2018, SLAC made its debut in the FIBA Africa Basketball League, the top pan-African league. On 1 March 2018, SLAC played its first game ever at an African main tournament, losing 80–65 to JS Kairouan.
 
In 2019, SLAC won its fourth domestic championship after beating BACK in the finals. Qualified as national champion of Guinea, SLAC played in the 2020 BAL Qualifying Tournaments. Before the start of the qualifiers, SLAC attracted Serbian head coach Zeljko Zecevic.

The following year, the team returned to the BAL qualifiers and qualified after beating Mali's AS Police after overtime in the semifinal. As a result, SLAC became the first team from Guinea to play in the BAL. With a 2–3 record in the Sahara Conference behind standout guard Chris Crawford, the team qualified for the playoffs. There, SLAC lost in the quarter-finals to the defending champions Zamalek from Egypt.

Players

Current roster
The following was the SLAC roster for the 2022 BAL season:

Depth chart

Notable players

Head coaches

Honours
Ligue 1
Winners (6): 2014–15, 2015–16, 2016-17, 2018–19, 2019–20, 2020–21
Basketball Africa League

 Quarter-finalist (1): 2022

In the Basketball Africa League

References

External links
Official Twitter profile

Basketball Africa League teams
Basketball teams in Guinea
Basketball teams established in 2004
Conakry

Road to BAL teams